Lillom was a theme park which was opened in 1985 in Lomme, near the city of Lille. The project was initiated by Arthur Notebart, then mayor of Lomme and president of the Urban Community of Lille. It was one of the first French theme parks, and its themes were the history of mankind from prehistory to the future. The park was organized around a large lake, in five main areas:
Prehistoric area
Medieval city
Turn-of-the-century area
World of the future

Its mascot was a green dinosaur, Lommy.

It closed in 1987 because it never turned any profit. Part of the park was destroyed to make way for the LGV Nord. The Middle-Ages city still exists today and houses a circus school.

External links
 

Defunct amusement parks in France
1985 establishments in France
1987 disestablishments in France
Amusement parks opened in 1985
Amusement parks closed in 1987
Amusement parks in France